Ockrilla, is a village in the district of Meissen, Saxony, Germany. With 633 inhabitants, it is the largest village in the municipality of Niederau.

The village was the birthplace of Gottlob Krause.

Meissen (district)
Niederau